"On the Great Road", commonly known as We Walk on the Great Road, is a Chinese patriotic song written and composed by Li Jiefeng in 1962 and published the following year. The song alludes to the metaphorical road to development for the Chinese people and state after the Great Leap Forward, as well as to the Long March undertaken by Mao Zedong and the Chinese Communist Party in 1934. We Walk on the Great Road was a popular patriotic songs during the Cultural Revolution, and its optimistic tone and simple lyrics cemented it as one of the most popular and enduring patriotic songs of the era, being ranked by the Chinese National Culture Promotion Association as one of the 124 greatest Chinese musical works. Notably, the song was sung extensively during the transfer of sovereignty over Hong Kong, and featured prominently in the 50th Anniversary of the People's Republic Parade in 1999.

History
At the onset of the Second Sino-Japanese War in 1937, Li Jiefeng (born Li Yunlong) began songwriting for the Yan'an People's Drama Society of the Red Army of Workers and Peasants in China, a propagandist organisation in association with the Chinese Communist Party. Previously a pickpocket, Li was transferred to the Eighth Route Army in Northwestern China to aid in the propaganda effort. By 1939, Li had already produced a number of popular anti-Japanese songs, such as 'Our Iron Cavalry', 'Two Little Cows Singing', and 'The Five Champions of Langya Mountain'. By 1945, Li had become the President of the Yan'an People's Drama Society, and became responsible for much of the propaganda dissemination over Northwestern China.

In 1958, Mao Zedong implemented the Great Leap Forward, a series of economic and social policies attempting to modernise infrastructure and increase industrial output across China. This caused nationwide famine, and generally began to erode popular support for the communist system. In response, the CPC began aggressively increasing propaganda output in the early 1960s. It was under these conditions that Li created the song 'We Walk on the Great Road'. Allegedly, Li received inspiration for the lyrics after a chance meeting with a former friend and soldier during a visit to Beijing, who impressed Li with his iron resolve and optimistic disposition. The song was reportedly a personal favourite of Zhou Enlai.. The lyrics were altered to be more nationalistic in tone during the Cultural Revolution.

After the discrediting of the Gang of Four, the song was temporarily banned, however was eventually re-permitted following lyrical alterations, largely reverting to the original lyrics and removing references to Anti-Americanism, the Cultural Revolution, and Mao Zedong.

Original Lyrics

Lyrics during the Cultural Revolution

Contemporary Lyrics

References

See also
Dong Fang Hong I
The East Is Red (1965 film)
Honglaowai
Maoism
"Ode to the Motherland"
"Sailing the Seas Depends on the Helmsman"
"Without the Communist Party, There Would Be No New China"
"The East Is Red again"
The Long March
The Great Leap Forward

Historical national anthems
Cultural Revolution
Chinese patriotic songs
Maoist China propaganda songs
Asian anthems
Songs about Mao Zedong
Chinese military marches